Mark Aiston is an Australian sports journalist and sports presenter.

Aiston is currently a breakfast radio presenter on FIVEaa. He was previously a sport presenter on Ten Eyewitness News and breakfast radio presenter on Mix 102.3.

Career
Aiston began his career in 1982 as a race announcer for 5DN before becoming sports host for ABC News in Adelaide. He joined Network Ten in 1996 as chief Australian rules football reporter, before being made sports presenter in late 1997. He has also worked for FIVEaa, and SEN 1116 (SEN 1323 in Adelaide).

Aiston has covered many sporting events at Network Ten, including: Sydney to Hobart, AFL, Melbourne Cup, Bathurst 1000, Indy Car, Moto GP, the Australian Grand Prix, the Adelaide 500, World Netball Championships and Australia Day celebrations.

In May 2014, Aiston resigned from Network Ten due to stress.

Aiston also plays a Kayfabe, National Wrestling Alliance liaison officer, at professional wrestling shows promoted by Zero1 Pro Wrestling Australia.

References

External links
Media Insider: Aiston's Website
Aiston's Blog

10 News First presenters
Living people
People from Adelaide
Australian sports journalists
Journalists from South Australia
Year of birth missing (living people)